Eckman is an unincorporated community in McDowell County, West Virginia, United States. Eckman is located along U.S. Route 52 to the west of the city of Keystone. Eckman was formerly known as Shawnee Camp. At Shawnee Camp, miner John Hardy reportedly murdered a man in a gambling dispute. His death was memorialized in the popular folk song, “John Hardy.”

References

Unincorporated communities in McDowell County, West Virginia
Unincorporated communities in West Virginia